Bibb County is located in the U.S. state of Georgia. As of the 2020 census, its population was 157,346. Bibb County is geographically located in the Central Georgia (Middle Georgia) region, and is the largest county in the Macon metropolitan area (metropolitan statistical area).

Bibb County has a consolidated city-county government following a merger of the county with its county seat and largest city, Macon, in 2014. They were later joined in this consolidated government in 2015 by the county's only other municipality, Payne City.

History 
This area was inhabited for thousands of years by successive indigenous peoples. The Ocmulgee National Monument is a national park and historic site incorporating two major mound and town complexes: Lamar Mounds and Village Site and Ocmulgee Mound Site, both located along the Ocmulgee River. They were built by indigenous peoples during the Mississippian culture era. The detailed chronicles of the Hernando de Soto expedition recorded visiting Ichisi, a major village, in 1539. Historians and archeologists have theorized it may have been located at the Lamar Mounds complex.

For centuries, the historic Native Americans Muscogee tribe, descendants of this culture, was the predominant one in a large area of Georgia, including that later organized as Bibb County. During the colonial period, Anglo colonists carried on a brisk trade with them and allied with them in certain wars in the Southeast. With European-American land hunger to extend cotton cultivation in the Georgia uplands, the Muscogee and other four Civilized Tribes of the Southeast were forcibly relocated to Indian Territory west of the Mississippi River, in the Indian Removal of the 1830s, during the administration of President Andrew Jackson. The Indian tribes affected refer to their journey is as the "Trail of Tears", since many died during the march west.

In the late 18th century, the cotton gin was invented, making profitable the processing of short-staple cotton. This could be grown across the uplands of the South, in contrast to the long-staple cotton of the Low Country. Bibb is considered one of the counties of the "Black Belt", which originally referred to the fertile dark soil in these uplands. The area was developed by European-American planters, who used enslaved African Americans as workers to clear land and develop large cotton plantations during the antebellum years. Cotton generated high profits, since it was in demand in the textile mills of the northern states and England. By the 1860 census, shortly before the American Civil War, more than a million enslaved African Americans lived in Georgia, and they constituted a majority of the population in much of the Black Belt.

Bibb County was created by act of the Georgia Legislature on December 9, 1822, with Macon to be incorporated as a town/city in December 1823; designated the county seat. It was carved from the earlier territories of the counties of Jones, Monroe, Houston, and Twiggs Counties. The county seat has not been changed since, and no other subsequent county in the state has ever been created ("erected") out of land from Bibb County.

The county was named for Dr. William Wyatt Bibb, a physician from Elbert County, who served in the U.S. House of Representatives and United States Senate from Georgia. After he moved to the new Alabama Territory, he was later elected as the first governor of the new State of Alabama upon its admission.

Civil War to present

During the Civil War, an estimated 10% of the white males in the county lost their lives while serving in the Confederate States Army. The war gained the emancipation of slaves across the South. Georgia had been a battleground, and Atlanta and many other areas were left in ruins.

Well into the 20th century, the county depended on cotton and other agriculture as its economic base. It was subject to related vagaries of weather, financial markets, and the devastation of the invasive boll weevil in the early 20th century, which destroyed cotton crops across the South.

After the Civil War and during the 20th century, the county seat of Macon continued to serve as the county's principal population center, site of the most significant landmarks, and the location of major historical events.

On July 31, 2012, voters in the City of Macon (57.8% approval) and Bibb County (56.7% approval) passed a referendum to merge the governments of the city and the county, based on the authorization of House Bill 1171 passed by the Georgia General Assembly earlier in the year. Four previous consolidation attempts (in 1933, 1960, 1972, and 1976) had failed. The consolidation took effect on January 1, 2014, along with the deannexation from the city of a small portion of land in Jones County.

In addition to Macon, Bibb County contained one other municipality, Payne City (or Payne), an enclave of around 200 people that was surrounded entirely by the preconsolidation City of Macon. In the 2012 referendum, Payne City voters rejected consolidation by a vote of 9 to 7, so it was not merged into the consolidated government. In early 2015, at the request of the small city's government, the Georgia General Assembly passed a bill dissolving Payne City, merging it with the rest of Macon-Bibb County.

Government and politics 
Since the 2014 consolidation, Macon-Bibb has been governed by a mayor, elected at-large (county-wide), along with a nine-member county commission with members elected from single-member districts.

Like all other Georgia counties, Bibb has an elected sheriff responsible for maintaining the jail. Bibb's sheriff also manages the county's law enforcement duties, with their deputies acting as the city and county police force. , the current sheriff is David Davis.

Elections

In 2013, the consolidated city-county held its first elections. Macon's incumbent mayor Robert Reichert received 49% of the vote in the general election on September 17 over the other five mayoral candidates, but a winner had to take a majority of the vote. Reichert subsequently won 63% of the vote in a runoff election against former Macon mayor C. Jack Ellis.
Reichert was unopposed for re-election in 2016, following the death of his only opponent before the election. Under the city-county charter, the mayor is subject to term limits and may serve only two consecutive terms. Reichert had to leave office in December 2020.

As an urban county with a majority African-American population, voters in Bibb County today consistently vote at high rates for Democratic candidates counties in presidential elections. During the late 19th century and into the late 1960s, when most African Americans were disenfranchised by the state constitution and practices under Jim Crow, white conservatives dominated the Democratic Party and voting. The combination of these two contrasting affiliations resulted in the majority of county voters having supported for a Republican presidential candidate only three times in its history. Bibb was the only county in the 2004 flag referendum to vote to keep the 2001 flag.

United States Congress

Georgia General Assembly

Georgia State Senate

Georgia House of Representatives

Geography 
The entirety of Bibb County is located in the Upper Ocmulgee River sub-basin of the Altamaha River basin.

Adjacent counties 
 Jones County - northeast
 Twiggs County - east
 Houston County - south
 Peach County - south-southwest
 Crawford County - southwest
 Monroe County - northwest

National protected areas 
 Bond Swamp National Wildlife Refuge (part)
 Ocmulgee National Monument

Transportation

Major highways 

  Interstate 16
  Interstate 75
  Interstate 475
  U.S. Route 23
  U.S. Route 41
 U.S. Route 41 Business (Macon)
  U.S. Route 80
  U.S. Route 129
 U.S. Route 129 Alternate (Macon)
  State Route 11
  State Route 19
  State Route 22
  State Route 49
  State Route 74
  State Route 87
  State Route 87 Connector
  State Route 247
  State Route 401 (unsigned designation for I-75)
  State Route 404 (unsigned designation for I-16)
  State Route 408 (unsigned designation for I-475)
  State Route 540 (Fall Line Freeway)

Pedestrians and cycling

 Heritage Trail
 Ocmulgee Heritage Trail

Demographics

2020 census

As of the 2020 United States census, there were 157,346 people, 56,726 households, and 33,573 families residing in the county.

2010 census
As of the 2010 United States Census, there were 155,547 people, 60,295 households, and 38,714 families residing in the county. The racial makeup of the county was 52.1% black or African American, 43.2% white, 1.6% Asian, 0.2% American Indian, 0.1% Pacific islander, 1.3% from other races, and 1.4% from two or more races. Those of Hispanic or Latino origin made up 2.8% of the population. In terms of ancestry, 8.8% were English, 7.6% were American, 6.6% were Irish, and 5.2% were German.

Of the 60,295 households, 33.7% had children under the age of 18 living with them, 37.5% were married couples living together, 22.0% had a female householder with no husband present, 35.8% were non-families, and 30.3% of all households were made up of individuals. The average household size was 2.48 and the average family size was 3.10. The median age was 35.6 years.

The median income for a household in the county was $38,798 and the median income for a family was $52,158. Males had a median income of $41,219 versus $31,477 for females. The per capita income for the county was $21,436. About 16.4% of families and 22.4% of the population were below the poverty line, including 33.0% of those under age 18 and 12.8% of those age 65 or over.

2000 census
As of the census of 2000, there were 153,887 people, 59,667 households, and 39,797 families residing in the county. There were 67,194 housing units at an average density of 269 per square mile (104/km). The racial makeup of the county was 50.13% White, 47.32% Black or African American, 0.18% Native American, 1.08% Asian, 0.02% Pacific Islander, 0.46% from other races, and 0.81% from two or more races.  1.31% of the population were Hispanic or Latino of any race.

There were 59,667 households, out of which 31.90% had children under the age of 18 living with them, 42.30% were married couples living together, 20.60% had a female householder with no husband present, and 33.30% were non-families. 28.20% of all households were made up of individuals, and 9.80% had someone living alone who was 65 years of age or older.  The average household size was 2.49 and the average family size was 3.06.

In the county, the population was distributed with 26.60% under the age of 18, 10.10% from 18 to 24, 29.00% from 25 to 44, 21.70% from 45 to 64, and 12.70% who were 65 years of age or older.  The median age was 35 years. For every 100 females, there were 85.20 males.  For every 100 females age 18 and over, there were 80.20 males.

The population tables show a dramatic reduction in population growth from 1920 to 1940, less than half the amounts for censuses before and after these dates; during this period, tens of thousands of African Americans left the state for cities in the North and Midwest, as part of the Great Migration.

The median income for a household in the county was $34,532, and the median income for a family was $43,479. Males had a median income of $34,263 versus $25,540 for females. The per capita income for the county was $19,058.  About 15.50% of families and 19.10% of the population were below the poverty line, including 28.20% of those under age 18 and 13.10% of those age 65 or over.

Recreation

Claystone, Sandy Beach, and Arrowhead Parks, each with a beach, and children's playgrounds. Sandy Beach has lighted tennis courts, a water park with many attractions, and a softball field.

Communities

Cities
 Macon (county seat)
 Payne

Unincorporated communities
 Avondale
 Franklinton
 Lizella
 Sofkee
 Walden

See also

 National Register of Historic Places listings in Bibb County, Georgia
List of counties in Georgia

References

External links

 

 
1822 establishments in Georgia (U.S. state)
Populated places established in 1822
Georgia (U.S. state) counties
Macon, Georgia
Macon metropolitan area, Georgia
Black Belt (U.S. region)
Majority-minority counties in Georgia